Soraya Tarzi (Pashto/Dari: ثريا طرزي; November 24, 1899 – April 20, 1968) was the first queen consort of Afghanistan as the wife of King Amanullah Khan. She played a major part in the modernization reforms of Amanullah Khan, particularly in regard to the emancipation of women. 

Born in Syria, she was educated by her father, who was the Afghan leader and intellectual Sardar Mahmud Beg Tarzi. She belonged to the Mohammadzai Pashtun tribe, a sub-tribe of the Barakzai dynasty.  As Queen of Afghanistan, she was not only filling a position – but became one of the most influential women in the world at the time. Owing to the reforms King Amanullah Khan instituted, the country's religious sects grew violent. In 1929, the King abdicated in order to prevent a civil war and went into exile. Their first stop was India, then part of the British Empire.

Early life and family background

Suraiya Shahzada Tarzi was born on 24 November 1899, in Damascus, Syria, then part of the Ottoman Empire.  She was the daughter of the Afghan political figure Sardar Mahmud Beg Tarzi, and granddaughter of Sardar Ghulam Muhammad Tarzi. 
She studied in Syria, learning Western and modern values there, which would influence her future actions and beliefs. Her mother was Asma Rasmya Khanum, second wife of her father, and daughter of Sheikh Muhammad Saleh al-Fattal Effendi, of Aleppo, Muezzin of the Umayyad Mosque.

When Amanullah's father (Habibullah Khan) became the King of Afghanistan in October 1901, one of his most important contributions to his nation was the return of Afghan exiles, specifically the Tarzi family and others, who advocated for the modernization of Afghanistan. Upon her family's return to Afghanistan, Soraya Tarzi would meet and marry King Amanullah Khan.

After the Tarzis returned to Afghanistan, they were received at Court as wished by the Amir Habibullah Khan. This is where Soraya Tarzi met Prince Amanullah, son of the Amir Habibullah Khan. They struck an affinity. The prince, who was a sympathiser of Mahmud Tarzi's liberal ideas, married Soraya Tarzi on 30 August 1913 at Qawm-i-Bagh Palace in Kabul.  Soraya Tarzi became the future King Amanullah Khan's only wife, which broke centuries of tradition: Amanullah was to dissolve the royal harem when he succeeded to the throne and free the enslaved women of the harem. It was when she married into the royal family that she grew to be one of the region's most important figures.

Queen of Afghanistan

When the prince became Amir in 1919 and subsequently King in 1926, the Queen had an important role in the evolution of the country. Queen Soraya was the first Muslim consort who appeared in public together with her husband, something which was unheard of at the time.  She participated with him in the hunting parties, riding on horseback, and in some Cabinet meetings.

Women's rights

Amanullah drew up the first constitution, establishing the basis for the formal structure of the government and setting up the role of the monarch within the constitutional framework.  Amanullah was influenced and encouraged by Mahmud Tarzi in his endeavors.   Tarzi was specifically instrumental in designing and implementing changes pertaining to women through his personal example of monogamy.   His daughter, Queen Soraya Tarzi, would be the face of this change.  Another daughter of Tarzi's married Amanullah's brother.  Thus, it is not surprising that Tarzi's sophisticated and liberal intellectual ideology blossomed and concretely embedded itself in Amanullah's reign.

King Amanullah Khan publicly campaigned against the veil, against polygamy, and encouraged education of girls not just in Kabul but also in the countryside.  The emancipation of women was a part of Amanullahs reform policy, and the women of the royal family, particularly his wife and sisters, acted as the role models of this change.  Many women from Amanullah's family publicly participated in organizations and went on to become government officials later in life.  Soraya was instrumental in enforcing change for women and publicly exhorted them to be active participants in nation building. 

In 1921 she founded and contributed to  the first magazine for women,  Ishadul Naswan (Guidance for Women)  which as edited by her mother,  as well as the first women's organisation, Anjuman-i Himayat-i-Niswan, which promoted women’s welfare and had an office to which women could report mistreatment by their husbands, brothers, and fathers.  She founded a theatre in Paghman which, although segregated for women, still gave women an opportunity to find their own social scene and break the harem seclusion.   

King Amanullah Khan said, "I am your King, but the Minister of Education is my wife — your Queen". 
Queen Soraya encouraged women to get an education and opened the first primary school for girls in Kabul, the Masturat School (later the Ismat Malalai School), in 1921, as well as the first hospital for women, the Masturat Hospital, in 1924.  
In 1926, at the seventh anniversary of Independence from the British, Soraya gave a public speech:
It (Independence) belongs to all of us and that is why we celebrate it. Do you think, however, that our nation from the outset needs only men to serve it? Women should also take their part as women did in the early years of our nation and Islam. From their examples we must learn that we must all contribute toward the development of our nation and that this cannot be done without being equipped with knowledge. So we should all attempt to acquire as much knowledge as possible, in order that we may render our services to society in the manner of the women of early Islam.
She sent 15 young women to Turkey for higher education in 1928.  These fifteen were all graduates of the Masturat middle school she had founded, mainly daughters of the royal family and government officials.  

The Swedish memoir writer Rora Asim Khan, who lived in Afghanistan with her Afghan husband in 1926-1927, describe in her memoirs how she was invited to the Queen at Paghman and Darullaman to describe Western life style and fashion to the Queen and the king's mother; she noted that the Queen had many questions, since she was soon due to visit Europe. 

In 1927-1928, Soraya and her husband visited Europe.  On this trip they were honoured and feted, and greeted by crowds.  In 1928, the King and Queen received honorary degrees from Oxford University, being seen as both promoters of enlightened Western values, and ruling an important buffer state, between the British Indian empire, and Soviet ambitions.  The Queen spoke to a large group of students and leaders. 

The unveiling of women was a controversial part of the reform policy.  Women of the royal family already wore Western fashion before the accession of Amanullah, but they did so only within the enclosed royal palace complex and always covered themselves in a veil when leaving the royal area.  Throughout her husband's reign, Queen Soraya wore wide-brimmed hats with a diaphanous veil attached to them.   On August 29, 1928 Amanullah held a Loya Jirgah, a Grand Assembly of Tribal Elders, to endorse his development programs, and to which the 1,100 delegates were required to wear European clothes provided for them by the state. Amanullah argued for women’s rights to education and equality.  Amanullah said that "Islam did not require women to cover their bodies or wear any special kind of veil", and asked his wife to discard her veil. At the conclusion of the speech, Queen Soraya tore off her veil (hejab) in public and the wives of other officials present at the meeting followed this example.  After that, Soraya appeared in public without a veil and the women of the royal family and the wives of government employees followed her example.  In Kabul, this policy was also endorsed by reserving certain streets for men and women dressed in modern Western clothing.  Conservatives objected to the unveiling of women, but did not say so openly at the meeting, instead beginning to mobilize public opinion after their return from the meeting. 

This was an era when other Muslim nations, like Turkey, Iran and Egypt were also on the path to Westernization.  Hence, in Afghanistan, the elite was impressed by such changes and emulated their development models, but the time may have been premature.  Not only did conservative Muslims disagree with the changes, some alleged that the opposition was stoked by the British agents distributing international publications showing Soraya without a veil, dining with foreign men, and having her hand kissed by the leader of France, Germany, etc. among tribal regions of Afghanistan.  The British did not have a good relationship with Soraya's family as a whole, for the chief representative of Afghanistan that they had to deal with was her father, Mahmud Tarzi.  Conservative Afghans and regional leaders took the images and details from the royal family's trip to be a flagrant betrayal of Afghan culture, religion, and "honour" of women.

Final years

In 1929, the King abdicated in order to prevent a civil war and went into exile.  Queen Soraya lived in exile in Rome, Italy, with her family, having been invited by Italy.  She died on 20 April 1968 in Rome.

The funeral was escorted by the Italian military team to the Rome airport, before being taken to Afghanistan where a solemn state funeral was held. She is buried in Bagh-e Amir Shaheed, the family mausoleum in a large marble plaza, covered by a dome roof held up by blue columns in the heart of Jalalabad, next to her husband the King, who had died eight years earlier.

Her youngest daughter, Princess India of Afghanistan, has visited Afghanistan in the 2000s, setting up various charity projects. Princess India is also an honorary cultural ambassador of Afghanistan to Europe. In September 2011, Princess India of Afghanistan was honored by the Afghan-American Women Association for her work in women's rights.

Honours 

National honour
 Grand Collar of the Order of the Supreme Sun.

 Foreign honours 
Time Magazine's woman of the Year, 1927.
 Decoration of al-Kemal in brilliants (Kingdom of Egypt, 26 December 1927).
 Honorary Dame Grand Cross of the Order of the British Empire (United Kingdom, 13 March 1928).

Ancestry

References

External links

A History of Women in Afghanistan: Lessons Learnt for the Future or Yesterdays and Tomorrow: Women in Afghanistan By Dr. Huma Ahmed-Ghosh
Old pictures of the Queen Soraya of Afghanistan

Afghan royal consorts
Afghan feminists
Barakzai dynasty
1899 births
1968 deaths
Afghan secularists
Afghan exiles
Pashtun women
People from Damascus
20th-century Afghan politicians
Honorary Dames Grand Cross of the Order of the British Empire
Afghan expatriates in Italy
Afghan expatriates in the Ottoman Empire